Patrick Dooley (20 October 1898 – 3 April 1969) was an Australian rules footballer who played with Richmond in the Victorian Football League (VFL).

Notes

External links 
		

1898 births
1969 deaths
Australian rules footballers from Victoria (Australia)
Richmond Football Club players